The Twenty-eighth Dynasty of Egypt (notated Dynasty XXVIII, alternatively 28th Dynasty or Dynasty 28) is usually classified as the third dynasty of the Ancient Egyptian Late Period. The 28th Dynasty lasted from 404 BC to 398 BC and it includes only one Pharaoh, Amyrtaeus (Amenirdis), also known as Psamtik V or Psammetichus V. Amyrtaeus was probably the grandson of the Amyrtaeus of Sais, who carried on a rebellion in 465–463 BC with the Egyptian chief, Inarus (himself a grandson of Psamtik III), against the satrap Achaemenes of Achaemenid Egypt.

History
As early as 411 BC, Amyrtaeus, a native Egyptian, revolted against Darius II, the Achaemenid Persian King and the last Pharaoh of the 27th Dynasty. Amyrtaeus succeeded in expelling the Persians from Memphis in 405 BC with assistance from Cretan mercenaries, and in 404 BC, following the death of Darius, proclaimed himself Pharaoh of Egypt. Although Artaxerxes II, Darius' successor as King of Persia attempted to lead an expedition to retake Egypt he was unable to do so, due to political problems with his brother, Cyrus the Younger. This allowed Amyrtaeus to solidify Egyptian rule over Egypt.

Very little is known about Amyrtaeus' reign. No monuments from this dynasty have been found.

In 398 BC Amyrtaeus was overthrown and executed by Nefaarud I, ending the 28th Dynasty and beginning the 29th Dynasty.

Pharaohs of the 28th Dynasty

References

Sources 
 O. Perdu, 'Saites and Persians (664-332),' in A.B. Lloyd (ed.), A Companion to Ancient Egypt (Chichester, 2010), 140-58 (at 153–7).
 J.D. Ray, 'Egypt: Dependence and Independence (425-343 B.C.)', in Achaemenid History 1 (Leiden, 1987), 79–95.

See also

History of Ancient Egypt

 
States and territories established in the 5th century BC
States and territories disestablished in the 4th century BC
28
404 BC
5th-century BC establishments in Egypt
398 BC
4th-century BC disestablishments in Egypt